The 2012 Quebec Men's Provincial Curling Championship (also known as the Quebec Tankard) was held January 24–29, 2012 at the Club de Curling Kénogami in Jonquière, Quebec. The winning team of Robert Desjardins, represented Quebec at the 2012 Tim Hortons Brier in Saskatoon, Saskatchewan.

Format changes
The 2011–2012 season saw a new format for both the men and women's provincial playdowns. The men's tournament consisted of twelve teams in a triple knockout format, and playing for spots in a four team page playoff. Eight teams, four from east Quebec and four from the west Quebec, will qualify through zones playdowns, and four teams will qualify through the points system. This change means the defending champion from the previous season will no longer receive an automatic berth into the provincial playdowns and will see two additional teams compete in the provincial playdown.

Teams

Draw Brackets

A Event

B Event

C Event

Playoffs

C1 vs. C2
January 28, 19:00

A vs. B
January 28, 19:00

Semifinal
January 29, 09:00

Final
January 29, 14:00

References

Quebec Mens Provincial Curling Championship
Sport in Saguenay, Quebec
Curling competitions in Quebec
Quebec Men's Provincial
Quebec Men's Provincial Curling Championship